The 1990 St. Louis Cardinals season was the team's 109th season in St. Louis, Missouri and its 99th season in the National League. The Cardinals went 70-92 during the season and finished 6th (and last) in the National League East division, 25 games behind the NL East champion Pittsburgh Pirates.  It was one of the few times that the Cardinals had finished in last place, and the first, and only time that it has happened since 1918.

Offseason
 November 28, 1989: Bryn Smith was signed as a free agent by the Cardinals.
 November 30, 1989: Danny Cox was signed as a free agent by the Cardinals.
 December 6, 1989: Jim Lindeman and Matt Kinzer were traded by the Cardinals to the Detroit Tigers for Bill Henderson (minors), Marcos Betances (minors), and Pat Austin (minors).
 February 27, 1990: Alex Cole and Steve Peters were traded by the Cardinals to the San Diego Padres for Omar Olivares.

Regular season
Shortstop Ozzie Smith won a Gold Glove this year.

Opening Day starters
Tom Brunansky
Vince Coleman
Pedro Guerrero
Joe Magrane
Willie McGee
José Oquendo
Terry Pendleton
Ozzie Smith
Todd Zeile

Season standings

Record vs. opponents

Notable transactions
 April 23, 1990: John Costello was traded by the Cardinals to the Montreal Expos for Rex Hudler.
 May 4, 1990: Tom Brunansky was traded by the Cardinals to the Boston Red Sox for Lee Smith.
 May 5, 1990: Terry Francona was signed as a free agent by the Cardinals.
 July 2, 1990: Ernie Camacho was signed as a free agent by the Cardinals.
 August 29, 1990: Willie McGee was traded by the Cardinals to the Oakland Athletics for Félix José, Stan Royer, and Daryl Green (minors). However, McGee would win the NL batting title (he had enough plate appearances to qualify for it despite this trade).

Roster

Player stats

Batting

Starters by position
Note: Pos = Position; G = Games played; AB = At bats; R = Runs; H = Hits; Avg. = Batting average; HR = Home runs; RBI = Runs batted in; SB = Stolen bases

Other batters
Note: G = Games played; AB = At bats; R = Runs; H = Hits; Avg. = Batting average; HR = Home runs; RBI = Runs batted in; SB = Stolen bases

Pitching

Starting pitchers
Note: G = Games pitched; IP = Innings pitched; W = Wins; L = Losses; ERA = Earned run average; BB = Walks allowed; SO = Strikeouts

Other pitchers
Note: G = Games pitched; IP = Innings pitched; W = Wins; L = Losses; ERA = Earned run average; BB = Walks allowed; SO = Strikeouts

Relief pitchers
Note: G = Games pitched; IP = Innings pitched; W = Wins; L = Losses; SV = Saves; ERA = Earned run average; BB = Walks allowed; SO = Strikeouts

Awards and honors
  Willie McGee, outfielder:  Batting title (.335)
  Ozzie Smith, shortstop, National League Gold Glove

All-Stars 
  Ozzie Smith, starter, shortstop

Farm system

References

External links
1990 St. Louis Cardinals at Baseball Reference
1990 St. Louis Cardinals team page at www.baseball-almanac.com

St. Louis Cardinals seasons
Saint Louis Cardinals season
St Lou